This is a list of members of the South Australian House of Assembly from 1962 to 1965, as elected at the 1962 state election:

 The Labor member for Mount Gambier, Ron Ralston, died on 30 October 1962. Labor candidate Allan Burdon won the resulting by-election on 15 December 1962.
 The LCL member for Yorke Peninsula, Sir Cecil Hincks, died on 1 January 1963. LCL candidate James Ferguson won the resulting by-election on 9 February 1963.
 The LCL member for Stirling, William Jenkins, died on 30 August 1963. LCL candidate William McAnaney won the resulting by-election on 28 September 1963.
 The Labor member for Semaphore, Harold Tapping, died on 6 September 1964. Labor candidate Reg Hurst won the resulting by-election on 3 October 1964.
 The member for Burra, Percy Quirke, was elected as an independent in 1962, but joined the LCL and entered the ministry in 1963.

Members of South Australian parliaments by term
20th-century Australian politicians